Linnansaari National Park is a national park in the Southern Savonia and Northern Savonia regions of Finland. It lies in the middle of the lake Haukivesi, a part of greater Saimaa. The National Park was established to conserve the valuable natural features of the Finnish lakeland.

On the main island there's an old croft. Slash-and-burn agriculture is still practised on its fields to conserve the old cultural landscape and the associated plant and animal species. A large part of the island is natural-state coniferous forest, with some herb-rich parts.

The critically endangered Saimaa Ringed Seal inhabits the park.

See also 
 List of national parks of Finland
 Protected areas of Finland

References

External links
 Outdoors.fi – Linnansaari National Park

National parks of Finland
Protected areas established in 1956
Geography of South Savo
Geography of North Savo
Tourist attractions in South Savo
Tourist attractions in North Savo
Haukivesi
Rantasalmi
Varkaus
Nature of Savonlinna